The large panel system-building is a building constructed of large, prefabricated concrete slabs. Such buildings are often found in housing development areas.

Although large panel system-buildings are often considered to be typical of East Germany, the prefabricated construction method was used extensively in West Germany and elsewhere, particularly in public housing (see tower block).

History
Prefabrication was pioneered in the Netherlands following World War I, based on construction methods developed in the United States. The first German use of large panel system-building construction is what is now known as the Splanemann-Siedlung in Berlin's Lichtenberg district, constructed in 1926–1930. These two- and three-storey apartment houses were assembled of locally cast slabs, inspired by the Dutch Betondorp in Watergraafsmeer, a suburb of Amsterdam.

In East Germany, large panel system-building areas have been designated as Neubaugebiet ("New development area"). Virtually all new residential buildings since the 1960s were built in this style, as it was a quick and relatively inexpensive way to curb the country's severe housing shortage, which had been caused by wartime bombing raids and the large influx of German refugees from further east. At the same time, many buildings from earlier eras had substantial drawbacks, such as coal heat, no hot running water, or bathrooms shared by multiple units. As these buildings fell into disrepair, many of their inhabitants moved into newer large panel system-building housing. Today, large panel system-building are often no longer desirable, due in part to their rapid deterioration as a result of their cheap and quick construction methods, while older housing stock has undergone extensive renovation or been replaced with more modern dwelling units.

There were several common large panel system-building designs. The most common series was the P2, followed by the WBS 70, the WHH GT 18, and Q3A. The designs were flexible and could be built as towers or rows of apartments of various heights.

There have been projects with low rise "plattenbauten" such as the town of Bernau just north of Berlin. This town had an almost complete historic center of mainly wooden framed buildings within its preserved city walls. Most of these were torn down after 1975 and during the eighties to be replaced by 2–4 storey buildings constructed of prefabricated concrete slabs. This 'development' and 'modernization' is today regarded as disastrous, and an enormous cultural loss, with the town largely replaced by drab concrete buildings of exceeding mediocrity.

To fit in with the medieval church and the almost complete city wall, the houses used rather small design units and decreased in height the farther away they were from the Church and the nearer they came to the city wall. A similar project was the Nikolaiviertel around the historic Nikolai church in Berlin's old centre. In the case of the Nikolaiviertel the buildings were made to look more historic.

Large panel system-building apartments were once considered highly desirable in East Germany, largely due to the lack of any other viable alternative. The main alternatives of the time were overcrowded, deteriorating prewar housing, often with wartime damage still visible, due to policies that chose not to repair the damaged housing stock. Since reunification a combination of decreasing population, renovation of older buildings, and construction of modern alternative housing has led to high vacancy rates, with some estimates placing the number of unoccupied units at around a million. Many large panel system-building apartments were built in giant settlements, often on the edge of cities (such as Marzahn and Hellersdorf in Berlin and Halle-Neustadt), making them inconveniently located.

While some large panel system-building apartments have been renovated to a modern standard, some are being torn down. 

Berlin-based architect David Chipperfield has suggested that the plain appearance of Plattenbau housing does not promote gentrification, and may be a factor that helps preserve social continuity for local residents and neighborhoods.

In Finland, particularly in northern towns, such as Rovaniemi, Plattenbauten are commonplace. Rovaniemi was nearly completely destroyed during World War II and subsequently rebuilt from scratch, with new concrete panel buildings replacing old wooden houses and becoming a symbol of modernization. Whereas in the rest of Europe large panel system-building are associated with public housing, in Rovaniemi they are favoured by the middle classes on their way to purchasing a bungalow.

See also
 Hansaviertel
 HLM (France)
 Million Programme (Sweden)
 Panelház (Hungary)
 Gemeindebau (Austria)
 Panelák and Sídlisko (Czech Republic and Slovakia)
Khrushchyovka (Former Soviet Union)
Housing estate
Affordable housing
Public housing
Subsidized housing
Structural robustness
Architecture

Grosvenor Atterbury
Unité d'Habitation
Urban planning in communist countries

Safety

Ronan Point

Notes

References

Sources 
Meuser, Philipp; Zadorin, Dimitrij (2016). Towards a Typology of Soviet Mass Housing: Prefabrication in the USSR 1955 – 1991, DOM publishers, Berlin. .
Meuser, Philipp (2019). Prefabricated Housing. Construction and Design Manual, DOM publishers, Berlin.

External links

FIB international Bulletin 43 - structural connections for precast concrete buildings

Urban studies and planning terminology
Housing in Germany
Economy of East Germany
Prefabricated buildings
Concrete buildings and structures
Public housing
East German architecture
German words and phrases